The Bomb Shelter Sessions is the first studio album by Vintage Trouble, released on 25 July 2011.

Track listing

References

2011 debut albums
Vintage Trouble albums